Technopark Station is a subway station on Line 1 of the Incheon Subway in Jiha150, Songdogukje-daero, Yeonsu-gu, Incheon, South Korea.

Station layout

References

Metro stations in Incheon
Seoul Metropolitan Subway stations
Railway stations opened in 2009
Yeonsu District